A list of books and essays about D. W. Griffith:

Griffith, D
Bibliography